Karchów  is a village in the administrative district of Gmina Pawłowiczki, within Kędzierzyn-Koźle County, Opole Voivodeship, in south-western Poland.

References

Villages in Kędzierzyn-Koźle County